Peter Farmer may refer to:

 Peter Farmer (set designer) (1936–2017), British theater artist, set designer and book illustrator
 Peter Farmer (footballer) (1886–1964), Scottish football player and manager
 Peter Farmer (hammer thrower) (born 1952), Australian Olympic hammer thrower
 Peter Farmer (toxicologist) (born 1947), British toxicologist